Henry Calder (14 April 1858 – 2 May 1938) was an English cricketer. Calder was a right-handed batsman who bowled right-arm slow.

Career
Calder made his first-class debut for Hampshire County Cricket Club in 1882 against Sussex. Calder next represented Hampshire in the 1885 season, which was the club's last season with first-class status until the 1895 County Championship. Calder played four first-class matches for Hampshire in the 1885 season, with his final first-class match for the club coming against Somerset.

Sometime after his last first-class match for Hampshire, Calder moved to South Africa, where seven years after his last first-class appearance, he joined Western Province. Calder made his debut for Western Province against Transvaal in 1892. In 1895 Calder captained Western Province in the final of Currie Cup, where Western Province lost to Transvaal by 58 runs.

In 1897 Calder joined Eastern Province, playing two first-class matches for the Province against Western Province and Natal.

Calder scored 288 runs at an average of 16.94, with a high score of 44. With the ball, Calder took ten wickets at a bowling average of 22.50, with best figures of 3/34.

Death
Calder died at Southampton, Hampshire on 2 May 1938.

Family
Calder's son Harry Calder was named a Wisden Cricketer of the Year in 1918 and is regarded as one of the most unlikely cricketers ever to be named so. Harry never played first-class cricket.

External links
Henry Calder at Cricinfo
Henry Calder at CricketArchive
Matches and detailed statistics for Henry Calder

1858 births
1938 deaths
Cricketers from Southampton
English cricketers
Hampshire cricketers
Western Province cricketers
Eastern Province cricketers
People from South Stoneham